Choi Soo-In (born March 5, 2004) is a South Korean child actress. She first came to the attention of the public with her debut role in the 2016 film The World of Us, where she plays a lonely and outcast child who tries her utmost to hold onto her first friend.

Filmography

Films

Web series

Awards and nominations

References

External links
 Choi Soo-in at J,Wide-Company
 
 
 

2004 births
Living people
South Korean child actresses
South Korean film actresses
21st-century South Korean actresses